was born in Niihama, Ehime, Japan and was head teacher at Valley Zendo, a Sōtō Zen practice center in Charlemont, Massachusetts, USA. Fujita had done studies in child psychology at Tokyo University Graduate School, but abandoned them and became a Zen monk. At the age of twenty-nine, on 8 December, Fujita was ordained a Zen priest, along with Ryōdō Yamashita, by Kōhō Watanabe at Antai-ji temple.

In 1987, Fujita assumed the role of abbot at Valley Zendo, where he lived until his return to Japan in 2005.

2010 - 2018, he was the Director of the Soto Zen International Center.

See also
Timeline of Zen Buddhism in the United States

References

 J'Lit | Authors : Issho Fujita | Books from Japan 
 Buddhism 3.0: A Philosophical Investigation (Studies in Japanese Philosophy) : Isshō Fujita, Hitoshi Nagai, Ryōdō Yamashita

External links
Monk brings global view to Buddhism
Priestly pair set out to boost 'Buddhism 3.0' across Japan

Issho Fujita Official Website

Zen Buddhist abbots
Japanese Zen Buddhists
American Zen Buddhists
American Buddhist monks
Soto Zen Buddhists
1954 births
Living people
People from Niihama, Ehime